This page lists the châteaux of the French Centre-Val de Loire region. The buildings are arranged by Department.

Cher

Eure-et-Loir

Indre

Indre-et-Loire

Loir-et-Cher

Loiret

Notes and references

See also
 List of châteaux in France
 List of castles in France

 Centre